PtTPS-LAS may refer to:
 Levopimaradiene synthase, an enzyme
 Neoabietadiene synthase, an enzyme